This is a list of international prime ministerial trips made by Chris Hipkins, the 41st Prime Minister of New Zealand.

Prime Minister Chris Hipkins who took the office of Prime Minister of New Zealand on 25 January 2023 made his first prime ministerial trip to meet with his counter-part Prime Minister of Australia, Anthony Albanese on 7 February 2023 in Canberra, Australia.

Summary
The number of visits per country where Prime Minister Hipkins traveled are:
 One: Australia

2023

Multilateral meetings
Prime Minister Hipkins is scheduled to attend the following summits during his prime ministership.

Due to the 2023 New Zealand General Election being held on 14 October 2023, Hipkins' attendance to international summits for 2023 may be limited and may be attended by a delegation representative on behalf of the Prime Minister.

See also
 Sixth Labour Government of New Zealand
 Cabinet of New Zealand
 Foreign relations of New Zealand
 List of international prime ministerial trips made by Jacinda Ardern
 List of international prime ministerial trips made by Anthony Albanese

References

International prime ministerial trips
Hipkins
Hipkins, Chris
Foreign relations of New Zealand
Lists of diplomatic trips
2023 in international relations
Lists of 21st-century trips